Erdal Akdarı (born 5 June 1993) is a Turkish footballer who plays as a defender for Denizlispor.

Club career
He made his Süper Lig debut on 1 September 2012.

References

External links
 Erdal Akdarı at TFF.org
 
 
 

1993 births
Living people
Sportspeople from Batman, Turkey
Turkish footballers
Turkey youth international footballers
Kayserispor footballers
Denizlispor footballers
Süper Lig players
Regionalliga players
Association football defenders